State Route 182 (SR 182) is a  state highway that serves as the primary east-west connection along the Alabama shoreline of the Gulf of Mexico between Gulf Shores and Orange Beach in Baldwin County. The western terminus of SR 182 dead-ends at a private resort in Pine Beach, and the eastern terminus is located at the Florida state line.

Route description

SR 182 begins at a private resort in Pine Beach. From this point, the route travels in an easterly course paralleling the shoreline of the Gulf of Mexico through both Gulf Shores and Orange Beach en route to its eastern terminus at the Florida state line. Upon entering Florida, the route continues as State Road 292 (SR 292).

Major intersections

References

182
Transportation in Baldwin County, Alabama